Nemška Loka is a settlement in the Municipality of Kočevje in southern Slovenia. It was inhabited mostly by Gottschee Germans. During the Second World War its original population was expelled. The area is part of the traditional region of Lower Carniola and is now included in the Southeast Slovenia Statistical Region.

Name
Nemška Loka was attested in historical sources as Teutschau in 1574. The Slovene name Nemška Loka literally means 'German flood-meadow' and corresponds to the German name Unterdeutschau (literally, 'lower German flood-meadow'). The name refers to the local geography and the original ethnic German settlers that arrived in the 14th century.

History
In 1574 the village had twelve half-farms and one tenant farmer. During the Ottoman raids, the villagers were responsible for carrying letters to Kočevje and Poljane Castle in Predgrad. Straža Hill (834 m) west of the settlement was used for bonfires and cannons fired as signals during these raids. An elementary school was established in the village in 1860 (and discontinued in 1947). In 1965 there were 10 families living in the village: five Slovenian, three Bosnian, one Croatian, and one Romani.

Churches
The local parish church was dedicated to Mary Help of Christians and was a large Baroque pilgrimage church. It was demolished after the Second World War. A second church, dedicated to Saint Margaret in the hamlet of Tanči Vrh northwest of the main village was burned down in 1942 when the entire previously abandoned settlement was set on fire. It was not restored after the war. In 1980 the remaining nave collapsed and in 1992 the unsafe sanctuary was removed.

References

External links
Nemška Loka on Geopedia
Pre–World War II map of Nemška Loka with oeconyms and family names

Populated places in the Municipality of Kočevje